Emus is a genus of rove beetles with long, matted yellow, black, and grey hairs on the pronotum and parts of the abdomen. 

There are four known species within this genus:
Emus aeneicollis
Emus figulus
Emus hirtus 
Emus soropegus

References

Staphylininae